South Hollandic is a group of subdialects of the Hollandic dialect that are spoken in the southern part of the Hollandic-speaking area. An example of a South Hollandic dialect is The Hague dialect.

Dutch dialects
Languages of the Netherlands
Holland